Fărâmiţă Lambru (September 15, 1927 in Bucharest – December 12, 1974,  Bucharest) was a well-known Romani gypsy lăutar from Romania.

Biography
Fărâmiţă Lambru was born in a family of lăutari. As a child, he learned how to sing from his father, Tudor Fărâmiţă. He collaborated with Maria Tănase from 1953 until Maria Tănase died. Fărâmiţă Lambru started his own career as an accordion player and conductor.

Between 1952 and 1956, he was an instrumentalist in the folk music ensemble of the Bucharest Estates Theater, and in 1956 he moved to the band "Constantin Tănase". In 1967, he made his acting debut, playing in the musical "Groapa" as the singer Zavaidoc.

Between 1963-1970 he served as bandmaster, vocal and lead singer of the folk music band at the "Vasilescu" Regional Theater in Bucharest.

He took artistic tours in France (1965 and 1967), in the German Democratic Republic (1966), Italy (1966) and Moscow, U.S.S.R., gaining international fame. Returning to his home country, he made new recordings on the Electrecord record label.

References

1927 births
1974 deaths
Musicians from Bucharest
Romanian Romani people
Romanian accordionists
Romanian conductors (music)
Male conductors (music)
Lăutari and lăutărească music
20th-century conductors (music)
20th-century accordionists
20th-century male musicians